Yanis Papassarantis (born 12 March 1988, in Charleroi) is a Belgian football player.

Career
The left midfielder of Greek origin previously played for Roeselare, Standard Liège, Anderlecht, Charleroi and Tienen, but had his most successful period with Union SG, where he scored 15 goals in 52 matches.

References

External links
 
 

Living people
1988 births
Belgian footballers
R. Charleroi S.C. players
R.S.C. Anderlecht players
Standard Liège players
K.S.V. Roeselare players
Royale Union Saint-Gilloise players
K.V.K. Tienen-Hageland players
F.C.V. Dender E.H. players
Belgian people of Greek descent
Belgian Pro League players
Challenger Pro League players
Sportspeople from Charleroi
Footballers from Hainaut (province)
Association football forwards